This is an episode list for the American television sitcom 3rd Rock from the Sun, which ran from January 9, 1996 until May 22, 2001. During the course of the series, 139 episodes of 3rd Rock from the Sun aired over six seasons.

Series overview

Episodes

Season 1 (1996)

Season 2 (1996–97)

Season 3 (1997–98)

Season 4 (1998–99)

Season 5 (1999–2000)

Season 6 (2000–2001)

References

External links 
 
 
 
 Information and Episode Guide at TV.Yahoo.com
 Information and Episodes at Carsey Werner
 Official 3rd Rock Website

3rd Rock from the Sun